Daranak is a village in the Vardenis Municipality of the Gegharkunik Province of Armenia.

History 
The village was founded in 1921 by immigrants from Pambak.  In 1988-1989 Armenian refugees from Azerbaijan settled in the village.

References

External links 
 
 

Populated places in Gegharkunik Province
Populated places established in 1921